Barbara Perry (June 22, 1921 – May 5, 2019) was an American actress, singer and dancer who worked for 84 years in Hollywood and on Broadway.

Early life
 
Perry was born in Norfolk, Virginia. Her father, William Covington Perry, of Hopewell, Virginia, was a classical and jazz keyboardist, orchestra and band conductor, and orchestral arranger with the Happiness Boys, the New York NBC Radio Studios' (Blue Network) Interwoven Stocking Co. Hour, his own band called "Perry's Hot Dogs", with Ben Selvin and his Orchestra, and with many Broadway shows. He died of tuberculosis in Banning, California on October 30, 1936. Her mother, Victoria Mae (Gates) Perry of New Castle, Pennsylvania, sang soprano in the chorus of the Metropolitan Opera, at the Old Metropolitan Opera House, starting around 1925, under General Manager Giulio Gatti-Casazza.

Career

Being separated from her husband around the time she sang with the Metropolitan Opera Chorus, as a form of "childcare", she enlisted her only daughter, Barbara, as a member of the children's ballet of the Met's corps de ballet. This was the start of Barbara's lifelong dance training and career. Barbara's daughter also became an international opera singer in the 1980s, and her ancestor, Harriett Bellows Pierce, "... was educated in a college of music in Boston. She gave music and singing lessons on the frontier" while immigrating West. 

Barbara began her film career in 1933, when she appeared in Counsellor at Law. She also had a small part in The Mystery of Edwin Drood in 1935.

She headlined as a solo dancer (ballet-tap) in many top line nightclubs internationally, including work on Broadway and off-Broadway, in various productions. She was Eddie Foy Jr.'s dance partner, playing Anna in "Rumple" at the Alvin Theatre in 1957. In 1950 she was Mrs. Larry in Happy as Larry on Broadway.

By the mid-1950s to the early-1960s, she had studied acting at the Royal Academy of Dramatic Art in London, England, while performing opposite George Formby, Warde Donovan, and Sara Gregory in Zip Goes a Million at the Hippodrome and Palace Theatres, and upon her return to the USA had started appearing in numerous television series such as Perry Mason,The Donna Reed Show, The Andy Griffith Show, My Three Sons, and The Dick Van Dyke Show, where she played Buddy Sorrell's wife Pickles, before being replaced by Joan Shawlee.

In 1981, Perry wrote and performed in Passionate Ladies, a one-woman Broadway show at the Bijou Theatre. Her other Broadway plays included Swan Song (1946), If the Shoe Fits (1946), Happy as Larry (1950), and Rumple (1957).

She also played Thelma Brockwood on The Hathaways.

Perry's last known role was in the television series Baskets.

Personal life
Perry was first married to Bennett Warren James on December 13, 1953, in Las Vegas, Nevada, at the Flamingo Hotel and Casino where she  was headlining in the nightclub. Seymour Felix, Perry's producer, gave her away, as well as arranged and paid for the wedding. They divorced in Los Angeles, California on April 2, 1965. They had one daughter, Laurel Lee James.

Her second marriage was to animator Art Babbitt on April 14, 1967, in Hollywood, California, until his death in 1992. They had no  children.

Perry died on May 5, 2019, in Los Angeles at the age of 97.

Filmography

Film

Television

References

External links

 
 
 Barbara Perry at the American Film Institute
 Barbara Perry at Find a Grave

1921 births
2019 deaths
Actors from Norfolk, Virginia
American female dancers
American film actresses
American stage actresses
American television actresses
Dancers from Virginia
20th-century American dancers
20th-century American actresses
Actresses from Virginia
Broadway theatre people
21st-century American actresses